Polyadenylate-binding protein-interacting protein 2 is a protein that in humans is encoded by the PAIP2 gene.

Interactions 

PAIP2 has been shown to interact with PABPC1.

References

Further reading